is a private university in Hirakata, Osaka, Japan. The predecessor of the school was founded in 1928, and it was chartered as a women's medical college in 1947. In 1954 it became coeducational.

Organization
This university has following organization.

Graduate Schools
 Graduate School of Medicine
 Graduate School of Nursing

Faculties and Departments
 Faculty of Medicine
 Faculty of Nursing
 Department of Nursing
 Faculty of Rehabilitation
 Department of Physical Therapy
 Department of Occupational Therapy

Institutes and Centers
 Center for Medical Education
 Center for International Exchange
 Clinical Research Support Center
 Ethics Inspection Center
 Molecular Imaging Center of Diseases
 IPS/Stem Cell Research Support Center
 Clinical Training Center
 Institute of Biomedical Science

University Hospitals
 University Hospital
 University Medical Center
 Kori Hospital
 Kuzuha Hospital
 Temmabashi General Clinic

Campuses

Hirakata Campus 
 Campus is the main campus located in Hirakata, close to Hirakatashi Station, which includes the Faculty of Medicine, the Faculty of Nursing, and the university hospital.

Makino Campus 
 Campus is the second campus for the Faculty of Rehabilitation, located in Makino, Hirakata, close to Makino Station.

References

External links

 Official website

Educational institutions established in 1928
Private universities and colleges in Japan
Universities and colleges in Osaka Prefecture
1928 establishments in Japan
Hirakata, Osaka
Moriguchi, Osaka
Medical schools in Japan